Vasantha Obeysekera (1937 – 2017), was a Sri Lankan film director and screenwriter.

Early life and career 

Kala Keerthi Vasantha Obeysekera who was regarded as one of the foremost film makers in the 70s decade graduated from the University of Ceylon in 1962. He served on the Editorial Staff of the Associated Newspapers of Ceylon Limited from 1964 to 1970. In addition to his editorial work, Obeysekera wrote several short stories during this period.

Obeysekera entered the film industry with Sath Samudura in 1967 which he co-wrote and worked on as assistant director; it was Sri Lanka's entry at the Moscow International Film Festival. In 1971 he was awarded a certificate in Cinematography by the Comité de libération du cinéma français.

1970s
In the 1970s Obeysekera wrote and directed Ves Gaththo ("Masked Men") (1970), Valmathuwo ("Lost Ones") (1976), Diyamanthi ("Diamond") (1977) and Palangetiyo ("Grasshoppers") (1979). Palangetiyo won the Presidential Film Awards for Best Screenplay, Best Director and Best Film.

1980s
1983's Dadayama ("The Hunt") also won the Presidential awards for Best Screenplay, Best Director and Best Film. It was a commercial success as well. Obeysekera made Kedapathaka Chaya ("Reflections on the Mirror") in 1989 after a five-year break.

1990s and 2000s
In the late-'90s, Obeysekera made Maruthaya ("The Storm") (1995), Dorakada Marawa ("Death at the Doorstep") (1998) and Theertha Yathra ("Pilgrimage") (1999). These also secured several OCIC and Presidential Awards.

Salelu Warama ("Web of Love"), Agni Warsha ("Rains of Fire"), Aganthukaya ("The Stranger"), and Sewwandhi were made in the 2000s.

Filmography
He has directed 13 films across many dramatic genres.

 No. denotes the Number of Sri Lankan film in the Sri Lankan cinema.

Death
He died on 8 April 2017 in a private hospital in Colombo.

References

Sri Lankan film directors
Kala Keerthi
2017 deaths
1937 births